Boletopsis is a genus of mycorrhizal fungi in the family Bankeraceae. The genus was circumscribed by Swiss mycologist Victor Fayod in 1889, with Boletopsis leucomelaena as the type species.

Species
 Boletopsis atrata Ryvarden 1982 – Thailand
 Boletopsis grisea (Peck) Bondartsev & Singer 1941
 Boletopsis leucomelaena (Pers.) Fayod 1889 – Europe
 Boletopsis nothofagi J.A.Cooper & P.Leonard 2012 – New Zealand
 Boletopsis perplexa Watling & J.Milne 2006 – Scotland
 Boletopsis singaporensis Pat. & C.F.Baker 1918 – Singapore 
 Boletopsis smithii K.A.Harrison 1975 – United States
 Boletopsis staudtii Henn. 1898
 Boletopsis subsquamosa (L.) Kotl. & Pouzar 1957 (edible)

References

External links

Thelephorales
Thelephorales genera